James Stuart Russell M.A., D.Div., (1816 – 1895) was a pastor and author of The Parousia. The book was originally published in 1878 under title The Parousia: A Critical Inquiry into the New Testament Doctrine of Our Lord's Second Coming with a second edition published in 1887. A reprint of this edition by Baker Books is available under the title, The Parousia: The New Testament Doctrine of Our Lord's Second Coming.

Early life and ministry
James Stuart Russell, the son of a pious Scotsman, was born in Elgin, Morayshire on November 28, 1816. He entered King's College, University of Aberdeen at the age of twelve and completed his M.A. degree at eighteen. Due the influence of his older brother, Russell chose to pursue Christian ministry. He served in a law office for a time before studying in the Theological Halls of Edinburgh and Glasgow, ultimately finding his way to Cheshunt College.

In June 1843, Russell became an assistant minister at the Congregationalist Church in Great Yarmouth before taking over as minister. In 1857, Russell transferred to the Congregational Church in Tottenham and Edmonton. While holding this position, Russell visited Belfast to observe the working of the great Irish Revival and came under its influence. On his return, a similar revival occurred in his own church.

After a five-year term with his second church, Russell was attracted to a new church in the rapidly growing suburb of Bayswater, where the chapel on Lancaster Road was built in 1866. Russell continued to serve this church until his age, and failing health, led to his retirement near the end of 1888.

Russell was widely considered both an able preacher and a man of kindly deportment, which earned him a devoted following. Russell's fervor stretched beyond the limits of his own pastorate. He was present in 1843 at the formation of the Evangelical Alliance, with which he cooperated for the remainder of his life. He was an outspoken proponent of the Temperance Movement and the first Congregational Total Abstinence Association chairman. The National Temperance League and the United Kingdom Alliance counted him among their members. His advocacy of this cause was in frequent demand for meetings in London and its suburbs.

Publishing The Parousia 
Russell had held the doctrine of the past second Advent (Preterism) for many years before writing or even speaking on the subject. He used to describe how the matter came to him as a sort of revelation and that on discovering the key to the mystery, the whole theme gradually unfolded. In 1878, he anonymously published The Parousia, containing an exegesis on sections of the New Testament concerning the Second Coming of Jesus Christ. Another edition followed with the author's name attached.

This work drew much attention to the subject on both sides of the Atlantic. The University of Aberdeen soon signaled its appreciation of the book by conferring on the author a diploma in Divinity, which he valued all the more highly because it came from his alma mater.

Later life 
Russell's later years were marked with bodily infirmity and painful disease. In the midst of his sickness, he is quoted as having repeated the phrase, "On Christ the solid rock I stand!" His two children provided solace for him and assisted him during his final days. Russell died on October 5, 1895 and was buried in the Kensal Green Cemetery.

Charles Spurgeon 
While Charles Spurgeon did not share the eschatological views of J. Stuart Russell or the final conclusions of his book, in the 1878 issue of his magazine The Sword and the Trowel, Spurgeon wrote a short review of The Parousia: 
The second coming of Christ according to this volume had its fulfilment in the destruction of Jerusalem and the establishment of the gospel dispensation. That the parables and predictions of our Lord had a more direct and exclusive reference to that period than is generally supposed, we readily admit; but we were not prepared for the assignment of all references to a second coming in the New Testament, and even in the Apocalypse itself, to so early a fulfilment. All that could be said has been said in support of this theory, and much more than ought to have been said. In this the reasoning fails.  In order to concentrate the whole prophecies of the Book of Revelation upon the period of the destruction of Jerusalem it was needful to assume this book to have been written prior to that event, although the earliest ecclesiastical historians agree that John was banished to the isle of Patmos, where the book was written, by Domitian, who reigned after Titus, by whom Jerusalem was destroyed. Apart from this consideration, the compression of all the Apocalyptic visions and prophecies into so narrow a space requires more ingenuity and strength than that of men and angels combined. Too much stress is laid upon such phrases as 'The time is at hand,' 'Behold I come quickly,' whereas many prophecies of Scripture are delivered as present or past, as 'unto us a child is born,' etc., and 'Surely he hath borne our griefs, and carried our sorrows.' Amidst the many comings of Christ spoken of in the New Testament that which is spoken of as a second, must, we think, be personal, and thus similar to the first; and such too must be the meaning of 'his appearing.' Though the author's theory is carried too far, it has so much of truth in it, and throws so much new light upon obscure portions of the Scriptures, and is accompanied with so much critical research and close reasoning, that it can be injurious to none and may be profitable to all.Bob L. Ross, the publisher of Pilgrim Publications, was an ardent opponent to full preterism, yet he acknowledged the existence of this review.  Apparently, it was censored. - Todd Dennis

Gary DeMar 

Gary DeMar, president of American Vision, wrote: 
How many times have you struggled with the interpretation of certain Biblical texts related to the time of Jesus' return because they did not fit with a preconceived system of eschatology? Russell's Parousia takes the Bible seriously when it tells us of the nearness of Christ's return. Those who claim to interpret the Bible literally, trip over the obvious meaning of these time texts by making Scripture mean the opposite of what it unequivocally declares. Reading Russell is a breath of fresh air in a room filled with smoke and mirror hermeneutics.

R. C. Sproul 

The founder and chairman of Ligonier Ministries, R. C. Sproul also wrote regarding The Parousia: 
I believe that Russell's work is one of the most important treatments on Biblical eschatology that is available to the church today. The issues raised in this volume with respect to the time-frame references of the New Testament to the Parousia are vitally important not only for eschatology but for the future debate over the credibility of Sacred Scripture.

Kenneth Gentry 

While remaining reserved about the final conclusions of The Parousia, Kenneth Gentry, a theologian and a professor at Bahnsen Theological Seminary, concluded:
Although I do not agree with all the conclusions of J. Stuart Russell's The Parousia, I highly recommend this well-organized, carefully argued, and compellingly written defense of Preterism to serious and mature students of the Bible. It is one of the most persuasive and challenging books I have read on the subject of eschatology and has had a great impact on my own thinking. Russell's biblico-theological study of New Testament eschatology sets a standard of excellence.

Footnotes

External links 
 The Parousia: A Careful Look at Our Lord's Second Coming (HTML format)
 The Parousia (HTML format)
 Parousia lui Iisus translation in Romanian; Parousia in Romana, impartita in trei parti (fisiere .doc—Microsoft Word)

 LA PARUSÍA translation in Spanish

People from Elgin, Moray
Scottish Christian theologians
Alumni of the University of Aberdeen
1895 deaths
1816 births
Burials at Kensal Green Cemetery